Kill Bill Vol. 1 Original Soundtrack is the soundtrack to the first volume of the two-part Quentin Tarantino film Kill Bill. Released on September 23, 2003, it reached #45 on the Billboard 200 album chart and #1 on the soundtracks chart. It was organized, and mostly produced and orchestrated by RZA from the Wu-Tang Clan.

Soundtrack development
In a 2003 Interview, RZA spoke about the soundtrack's creation process:

Track listing
 "Bang Bang (My Baby Shot Me Down)" by Nancy Sinatra – 2:40
 "That Certain Female" by Charlie Feathers – 3:02
 "The Grand Duel (Parte Prima)" by Luis Bacalov – 3:24
 "Twisted Nerve" by Bernard Herrmann – 1:27
 "Queen of the Crime Council" dialogue by Lucy Liu and Julie Dreyfus – 0:56
 "Ode To Oren Ishii" by The RZA – 2:05
 "Run Fay Run" (from "Three Tough Guys") by Isaac Hayes – 2:46
 "Green Hornet" by Al Hirt – 2:18
 "Battle Without Honor or Humanity", often considered the "Kill Bill theme song" (from "Another Battle") by Tomoyasu Hotei – 2:28
 "Don't Let Me Be Misunderstood / Esmeralda Suite" by Santa Esmeralda featuring Leroy Gómez – 10:29
 "Woo Hoo" by The 5.6.7.8's – 1:59
 "Crane / White Lightning" by The RZA / Charles Bernstein – 1:37
 "The Flower of Carnage" 修羅の花　(from "Lady Snowblood") by Meiko Kaji – 3:52
 "The Lonely Shepherd" by James Last & Gheorghe Zamfir – 4:20
 "You're My Wicked Life" dialogue by David Carradine, Julie Dreyfus and Uma Thurman – 1:14
 "Ironside" (excerpt) by Quincy Jones – 0:16
 "Super 16" (excerpt) by Neu! – 1:06
 "Yakuza Oren 1" by The RZA – 0:22
 "Banister Fight" by The RZA – 0:21
 "Flip Sting" (SFX) – 0:04
 "Sword Swings" (SFX) – 0:05
 "Axe Throws" (SFX) – 0:11
The last three are merely noises that occur as sound effects in the film. The vinyl record version includes only the first fifteen tracks.

Also not included
Numerous tracks used in the film and to advertise it were not included in the soundtrack album:
 "Seven Notes in Black" by Vince Tempera – From Sette note in nero ("Seven Notes in Black"; AKA The Psychic). Heard when The Bride awakens and fends off her would-be rapists; background music for the RZA's "Ode to O-ren"
 "Truck Turner Theme" by Isaac Hayes – heard, appropriately enough, when The Bride tracks down Buck's truck.
 "Music Box Dancer" by Frank Mills - heard when the Bride pulls up to Vernita Green's house.
 "A Long Day of Vengeance" by Armando Trovaioli – From I lunghi giorni della vendetta. Heard in the anime sequence after one of Boss Matsumoto's men murders O-Ren's father.
 "Kaifuku Suru Kizu (The Wound That Heals)" by Lily Chou-Chou – From the film All About Lily Chou-Chou. Heard when The Bride marvels at Hattori Hanzo's sword collection.
 "I'm Blue" and "I Walk Like Jayne Mansfield" – additional songs performed by the 5.6.7.8's in the House of Blue Leaves.
 "From Man to Man" from the Death Rides a Horse soundtrack by Ennio Morricone – heard in the House of Blue Leaves battle. Used prominently to advertise Kill Bill.
 "Kenka Karate Kyokushin Ken Opening Theme" – heard in the house of Blue Leaves when the bride fights the boss of the crazy 88s.
 "Nobody but Me" by The Human Beinz – heard in the House of Blue Leaves battle.
 "Police Check Point" by Harry Betts (from the film Black Mama White Mama) – heard briefly in the House of Blue Leaves battle.
 "Yagyu Conspiracy" by Toshiaki Tsushima (from Shogun's Samurai) – background music for "You're My Wicked Life"
 "Funky Fanfare" by Keith Mansfield – heard as the logo music for the Our Feature Presentation film snipe.
 "I Giorni Dell'Ira" by Riz Ortolani (from Day of Anger) – heard when The Bride plucks an eye from one of the Crazy 88. This track would be later used in Django Unchained, where it was included in the soundtrack.
 "Champions of Death" by Shunsuke Kikuchi (from Champion of Death) – heard in the House of Blue Leaves battle.
 Other brief clips are not included nor are credits as to who wrote or performed them available.

See also
 Kill Bill Vol. 2 Original Soundtrack

Charts

Weekly charts

Year-end charts

Certifications

References

RZA albums
Kill Bill
2003 soundtrack albums
Maverick Records soundtracks

fr:Kill Bill#Bande originale